Georg Thomalla (14 February 1915 – 25 August 1999) was a German actor. He appeared in about one hundred fifty film and television productions between 1939 and 2000 and was widely known in Germany for his comedic roles.

Thomalla was well known in Germany as a voiceover artist, dubbing particularly comedians, such as Peter Sellers as Inspector Clouseau in the Pink Panther movies, and he was the standard German dubbing voice of Jack Lemmon from 1955 to 1998. Thomalla dubbed Lemmon as the second musician in Some Like It Hot, after having himself played the same role in the German comedy Fanfares of Love (1951), the direct predecessor to Some Like It Hot. Thomalla met Lemmon at the 1996 Berlin International Film Festival, where he gave a speech in Lemmon's honor.

He was awarded the German Federal Cross of Merit in 1985.

Selected filmography

 Her First Experience (1939) - Otto
 Der Kleinstadtpoet (1941) - Siegfried, Angestellter bei Emil
 Above All Else in the World (1941) - Uffz. Krause
 Jungens (1941) - Jochen Krafft
 Stukas (1941) - Unteroffizier Matz
 We Make Music (1942) - Franz Sperling
 The Crew of the Dora (1943) - Bordschütze Unteroffizier Fritz Mott
 Ein schöner Tag (1944)
 Nora (1944)
 Herr Sanders lebt gefährlich (1944) - Inspizient (uncredited)
 Der große Preis (1944) - Borchardt
 Ein fröhliches Haus (1944)
 Tierarzt Dr. Vlimmen (1944) - Stallbursche
 Anna Alt (1945) - Heinz Wichert
 Heidesommer (1945)
 Die tolle Susanne (1945)
 Peter Voss, Thief of Millions (1946) - Max Egon Flipp
 Tell the Truth (1946) - Dr. Klimm - sein Rechtsanwalt
 King of Hearts (1947) - Leutnant
  (1949) - Max, Mixer in der Kolibri-Bar
 Don't Play with Love (1949) - Peter
  (1949) - Knospe
 Der große Fall (1949) - Fred
 Three Girls Spinning (1950) - Udo
  (1950) - Attentäter
 One Night Apart (1950) - Bollmann
 Fanfares of Love (1951) - Peter
 Queen of the Night (1951) - Peter von Hazi
 Dark Eyes (1951) - McKing, Impresario
 A Very Big Child (1952) - Hans Hochberg
 My Wife Is Being Stupid (1952) - Conny Weber
 The Prince of Pappenheim (1952) - Charly Rosner
 The Chaste Libertine (1952) - Max Stieglitz
 Mikosch Comes In (1952) - Janos Nawratil
 Dancing Stars (1952) - Bob Gregorian
 The Uncle from America (1953) - Bodo Schmidt
 Lady's Choice (1953) - Max
 Fanfare of Marriage (1953) - Peter Schmidt
 The Charming Young Lady (1953) - Paul Norman
 It Was Always So Nice With You (1954) - Texter Karlchen Holler
 The Telephone Operator (1954) - Peter Lindner
 The Seven Dresses of Katrin (1954) - Graf Felix 'Lixi' Hohenstein
 Victoria and Her Hussar (1954)
 Secrets of the City (1955) - Paul Martinek
 As Long as There Are Pretty Girls (1955) - Ernst
 Request Concert (1955) - Willy Vogel
 Sky Without Stars (1955) - Willi Becker
 Mensch ärger' dich nicht! (1955)
 My Aunt, Your Aunt (1956) - Tommy Schneider
 Musikparade (1956) - Tommy
 Ein Mann muß nicht immer schön sein (1956) - Paul Späth
 A Piece of Heaven (1957) - Willi
 Victor and Victoria (1957) - Viktor Hempel
 Aunt Wanda from Uganda (1957) - Jonas Edelmuth
 Das Glück liegt auf der Straße (1957) - Tobby Zimmt
  (1957) - Karl Gerdes, Koch
 Ein Stück vom Himmel (1958) - Willi
 Scampolo (1958) - Andreas Michaels
 Ooh... diese Ferien (1958) - Max Petermann
 That Won't Keep a Sailor Down (1958) - Valdemar V. Olsen
 Das verbotene Paradies (1958) - Narrator (voice, uncredited)
  (1958) - Hadschi Halef Omar
 Paprika (1959) - Paul
  (1959) - Hadschi Halef Omar
 Lass mich am Sonntag nicht allein (1959) - Edi Gruber
 Juanito (1960) - Paddy
 The Haunted Castle (1960) - Onkel Max
  (1961) - Vittgers
 Adieu, Lebewohl, Goodbye (1961) - Luciano Moretti
  (1961–1971, TV Series) - Tommi
 The Dream of Lieschen Mueller (1961) - Reporter
 Ramona (1961) - Tom Kroll
 Nie hab ich nie gesagt (1962, TV Movie) - Herman
 The Bird Seller (1962) - Kurfürst August
 Snow White and the Seven Jugglers (1962) - Clown Lukas
  (1962) - Krummfinger Achilles
 The Forester's Daughter (1962) - Simmerl, Flickschneider
 Mit besten Empfehlungen (1963) - Ferdinand Blume, Lohnbuchhalter
 Bezauberndes Fräulein (1963, TV Movie) - Paul
 Tote zahlen keine Steuern (1963, TV Movie) - Marco Veccietti
 Casanova wider Willen (1964, TV Movie) - Max Stieglitz
 Gerechtigkeit in Worowogorsk (1964, TV Movie) - Defense Lawyer Kaljakin
 Der König mit dem Regenschirm (1964, TV Movie)
  (1964) - Geheimrat
 Don't Tell Me Any Stories (1964) - Hugo Bach
 Weekend in Paradise (1965, TV Movie) - Regierungsrat Dittchen
 Unser Pauker (1965–1966, TV Series, 20 episodes) - Ulrich Schulz
 I Am Looking for a Man (1966) - Astrologe Neumann
 When Ludwig Goes on Manoeuvres (1967) - Hauptmann Stumpf
 Zur Hölle mit den Paukern (1968) - Kurt Nietnagel
 Always Trouble with the Teachers (1968) - Studienrat Dr. Schwabmann
 Our Doctor is the Best (1969) - Waldemar Kosel
  (1969) - Paul Tillmann
 Help, I Love Twins (1969) - Uncle Fritz
  (1969) - The Lion (voice)
 Dornwittchen und Schneeröschen (1970) - Erzähler (voice)
  (1970) - Alois Wimmer
  (1970) - Oskar Weber / Harry Weber
  (1970) - Otto Sauser
  (1971) - Joachim Brinkmann
 Einer spinnt immer (1971) - Hugo Haase
 Holidays in Tyrol (1971) - Christian Meier
 The Reverend Turns a Blind Eye (1971) - Pfarrer Himmelreich
  (1972) - Dr. Guido Zwiesel
My Daughter, Your Daughter (1972) - Studienrat Dr. Oskar Sommer
 Always Trouble with the Reverend (1972) - Pfarrer Himmelreich
 Don't Get Angry (1972) - Ewald Fröhlich
 Crazy – Completely Mad (1973) - Oskar Müller
  (1973) - Dr. Karl Maria Wegner
 Auch ich war nur ein mittelmäßiger Schüler (1974) - Prof. Dr. Fabian
  (1978) - Christian Sturm
 Schimpo, was macht ein Aff' in Afrika? (1979)
 Kolportage (1980, TV Movie) - Barrenkrona
 Kintopp Kintopp (1981, TV Series) - Tommy Schnell
 Vater einer Tochter (1981, TV Movie) - Robert Stegemann
 Georg Thomallas Geschichten (1982, TV Series)
  (1982–1985, TV Series) - Peter Winter / Fred Paschke / Willi / Alexander Fischer / Manfred Freiwald / Tommy / Klaus Sommer
 Durchreise – Die Geschichte einer Firma (1985, TV Movie) - Max Salomon
 Ein Mann ist soeben erschossen worden (1985, TV Movie) - Comisario Ruíz
 Willi – Ein Aussteiger steigt ein (1990, TV Movie) - Willi Placzek
 Das Geld liegt auf der Bank (1990, TV Movie) - Gustav Kühne
 Kleiner Mann im großen Glück (1992, TV Movie) - Willi Platzek
 Lilien in der Bank (1996) - Wilhelm Willert
Television Series Episodes
 Polizeiinspektion 1: Der Schatten (1988) - Max Huber
 Meister Eder und sein Pumuckl: Eders Weihnachtsgeschenk (1988) - Preisslkofer
 Ein Schloß am Wörthersee: Ein Dinner für zwei (1990) - Harry Weber
 The Old Fox: Der amerikanische Onkel (1992) - Werner Lorenz
 Das Traumschiff: India and Maldives (1993) - Ewald Kolbus
 Klinik unter Palmen: Die Nächte der Kreolin (1998) - Walter Sobotzik
 : Ladendiebe (2000) - Jakob Landau

German-language Dubbing

External links

 
 
 Photographs and literature on Georg Thomalla

Officers Crosses of the Order of Merit of the Federal Republic of Germany
German male film actors
German male voice actors
1915 births
1999 deaths
20th-century German male actors